This is a list of songs and incidental music that have been featured on the long-running British science fiction television series Doctor Who.

Theme tune

See Doctor Who theme music.

Songs, classical music and popular tunes

First Doctor serials

Second Doctor serials

Third Doctor serials

Fourth Doctor serials

Fifth Doctor serials

Sixth Doctor serials

Seventh Doctor serials

Eighth Doctor television movie

Ninth Doctor episodes

Tenth Doctor episodes

Eleventh Doctor episodes

Twelfth Doctor episodes

Thirteenth Doctor episodes

See also
List of Doctor Who music releases
List of Doctor Who composers

References

External links
The Millennium Effect's Source Music Discography

Music
Music based on Doctor Who
Doctor Who